Felix Storch, Inc (FSI) is a supplier of specialty, professional, commercial, and medical refrigerators and freezers, and cooking appliances, founded in 1969.

History 
They trademarked the Summit Appliance brand name in their first year, and began their distribution in Long Island City, New York. In 1983, needing additional room for expansion, they moved their headquarters and operations to the Bronx. In 1998 they purchased their current HQ building in the Bronx, where their manufacturing, operations, back office, and distribution are all located. To accommodate Felix Storch, Inc.'s continued growth, in the 2008-2009 period they added state-of-the-art warehouse facilities in Edison, New Jersey, and purchased a building in Wallingford, Connecticut, housing their fabrication facility, bringing their total property for product development, manufacturing, and warehousing to nearly 300,000 square feet. Their products now include a wide range of major appliances sold both nationally and internationally and delivered to the Northeastern United States using their own FSI trucks.

Brands 
Felix Storch, Inc. houses four different lines: Summit Appliance, Summit Commercial, Accucold, and PureTherm. Today, they carry over 600 basic models of specialty refrigerators and freezers.

References 

1969 establishments in New York City
American companies established in 1969
Manufacturing companies established in 1969
Companies based in New York City
Home appliance manufacturers of the United States